Li Yan may refer to:

Li Yan (Three Kingdoms) (died 234), Shu military officer during the Three Kingdoms period
Emperor Wuzong of Tang (814–846), personal name Li Yan, emperor of the Tang dynasty of China
Emperor Xizong of Tang (862–888), birth name Li Yan, emperor of the Tang dynasty of China
Li Yan (Wu) (died 918), politician during Tang Dynasty and Wu
Li Yan (artist) (born 1977), Chinese artist
Athena Lee Yen (born 1981), Taiwanese actress
Yan Li (born 1955), Chinese-Canadian novelist

Sportspeople
Li Yan (speed skater) (born 1968), Chinese short track speed skater and coach
Li Yan (volleyball) (born 1976), Chinese volleyball player
Li Yan (cyclist) (born 1980), Chinese cyclist
Li Yan (footballer, born 1980), Chinese footballer for Shaanxi Baorong
Li Yan (footballer, born 1984), Chinese footballer for Guangzhou Pharmaceutical
Li Yan (snooker player) (born 1992), Chinese snooker player